German reunification was the process of re-establishing Germany as a single sovereign state, which took place between 2 May 1989 and 15 March 1991. As part of the reunification, East and West Berlin of the two countries were also united into a single city; it eventually became the capital of the country.

The East German government led by the Socialist Unity Party of Germany (SED) (a communist party) started to falter on 2 May 1989, when the removal of Hungary's border fence with Austria opened a hole in the Iron Curtain. The border was still closely guarded, but the Pan-European Picnic and the indecisive reaction of the rulers of the Eastern Bloc set in motion an irreversible movement. It allowed an exodus of thousands of East Germans fleeing to West Germany via Hungary. The Peaceful Revolution, a part of the international Revolutions of 1989 and a series of protests by the East Germans, led to the GDR's first free elections on 18 March 1990 and to the negotiations between the two countries that culminated in a Unification Treaty. Other negotiations between the two German countries and the four occupying powers in Germany produced the so-called "Two Plus Four Treaty" (Treaty on the Final Settlement with Respect to Germany), granting on 15 March 1991 full sovereignty to a reunified German state, whose two parts were previously bound by a number of limitations stemming from their post-World War II status as occupation zones, though only on 31 August 1994 did the last Russian occupation troops (Russia is the successor of the Soviet Union) leave Germany. 

After the end of World War II in Europe, the Berlin Declaration was signed and Germany was commonly occupied by the four Allied countries; later the Potsdam Agreement was also signed, leading to the German division, a full peace treaty concluding World War II for Germany was planned via its–including the exact delimitation of Germany's post-war boundary and this was required to be "accepted by the Government of Germany when a government adequate for the purpose is established." The geopolitical tension between the occupied Allies de facto ended the "Four Powers", and their intention to establish a new government for all of Germany then two countries was founded. The American, British, and French zones combined to form the FRG i.e. West Germany on 23 May 1949. The GDR i.e. East Germany was established in the Soviet zone on 7 October 1949, which means that Germany had been divided into the two independent territories since then. With the co-existence of two German states, West Germany maintained that no such government could be said to have been established until the two states had been united into one Germany within a free and democratic state. The West German government of chancellor Konrad Adenauer had rejected the 1952 Stalin Note sent to the three Western Allies to unify two Germanies into one under terms of neutrality. The government instead pursued a policy of West German rearmament while ending the process of denazification and declaring an amnesty, because West Germans did not trust the Soviets about a "neutral Germany" after the reunification. This led to the 1952 establishment of the Western European Union, and West German state joined NATO in 1955. In 1990, a range of opinions continued to be maintained over whether a reunited Germany could be said to represent "Germany as a whole" for this purpose. In the context of the successful and international Revolutions of 1989 against the communist states, including in the GDR; on 12 September 1990, under the Two Plus Four Treaty with the four Allies, both East and West Germany committed to the principle that their joint pre-1990 boundary constituted the entire territory that could be claimed by a government of Germany, and hence that there were no further lands outside this boundary that were parts of Germany as a whole occupied. East Germany re-established the federated states on its soil and subsequently dissolved itself on 3 October 1990; also on the same day, modern Germany was formed when the new states joined the FRG while East and West Berlin united into the German capital.

The reunited state is not a successor state, but an enlarged continuation of the 1949–1990 West German state. The enlarged Federal Republic of Germany retained the West German seats in the governing bodies of the European Economic Community (EC) (later the European Union/EU) and in international organizations including the North Atlantic Treaty Organization (NATO) and the United Nations (UN), while reliquinshing membership in the Warsaw Pact (WP) and other international organizations to which East Germany belonged.

Naming 

The term "German reunification" was given to the process of the German Democratic Republic joining the Federal Republic of Germany with full German sovereignty from the four Allied-occupied countries to distinguish it from the process of unification of most of the German states to create the German Empire which was led by the Kingdom of Prussia and took place from 18 August 1866 to 18 January 1871, 3 October 1990 was the day when Germany again became a single nation-state. However, for political and diplomatic reasons, West German politicians carefully avoided the term "reunification" during the runup to what Germans frequently refer to as "die Wende" (roughly: "the turning point").

After 1990, the term  became more common. The term generally refers to the events (mostly in Eastern Europe) that led up to the actual reunification, and loosely translates to "the turning point".  Anti-communist activists from Eastern Germany rejected the term  as it had been introduced by the Socialist Unity Party of Germany's Secretary General Egon Krenz.

Precursors to reunification 

On 5 June 1945, the defeat and fall of Nazi Germany was confirmed after its surrender and de facto fall on 8 May 1945 in World War II in Europe, and the occupation of the four countries representing the Allies i.e. the winners with the Allied Control Council (ACC) ruling Germany having the border before Nazi annexations (and Austria) was also officially founded; both by the Berlin Declaration. Germany was divided by the Allies into occupation zones under the four military governments of the United States, the United Kingdom, France, and the Soviet Union as one result of the Potsdam Agreement of the Potsdam Conference signed on 1 August 1945; Germany's border was also fixed by all four Allies in the Potsdam Agreement when Germany lost its eastern territories in east of Oder-Neisse line. In and after World War II in Europe; ethnic German who lived in the traditional lands in Central and Eastern Europe including the former German territories east of Oder-Neisse line, fled and were expelled to west of the line as well.

With the geo-political tension between the Allies between the Western Bloc and Eastern Bloc that led to the fact that the Soviet Union withdrew from the Allied Control Council on 20 March 1948 (however the ACC de jure still worked and the four occupation countries completely restored it in 1971); the foundation of a new German state became impossible. The Federal Republic of Germany or "West Germany", a liberal democracy, was established in the US-UK-French zones on 23 May 1949; the German Democratic Republic or "East Germany", a communist state, was established in the Soviet zone on 7 October 1949. In 1955, both German states nearly gained their sovereignty. The West German government did not recognize the new German-Polish border nor East Germany as part of its anti-communist policy but finally recognized both that made its relations with East Germany and the Soviet Union become better while East Germany also encouraged two-state status and peaceful coexistence after it denied the existence of West German state and after its request about German reunification under East Germany. 

 Mikhail Gorbachev had led the country as General Secretary of the Communist Party of the Soviet Union since 1985 with the fact that the Soviet Union experienced a period of economic and political stagnation, and correspondingly decreased intervention in Eastern Bloc politics. In 1987, the United States President Ronald Reagan gave a speech at the Brandenburg Gate, challenging Soviet General Secretary Mikhail Gorbachev to "tear down this wall" which divided Berlin. The wall had stood as an icon for the political and economic division between East and West, a division that Churchill had referred to as the "Iron Curtain". Gorbachev announced in 1988 that the Soviet Union would abandon the Brezhnev Doctrine and allow the Eastern bloc countries to freely determine their own internal affairs. In early 1989, under a new era of Soviet policies of glasnost (openness) and perestroika (economic restructuring), and taken further by Gorbachev, the Solidarity movement took hold in Poland. Further inspired by other images of brave defiance, a wave of revolutions swept throughout the Eastern Bloc that year. 
In May 1989, Hungary removed their border fence. However, the dismantling of the old Hungarian border facilities did not open the borders nor were the previous strict controls removed, and the isolation by the Iron Curtain was still intact over its entire length. The opening of a border gate between Austria and Hungary at the Pan-European Picnic on 19 August 1989 then set in motion a peaceful chain reaction, at the end of which there was no longer a GDR and the Eastern Bloc had disintegrated. Extensive advertising for the planned picnic was made by posters and flyers among the GDR holidaymakers in Hungary. The Austrian branch of the Paneuropean Union, which was then headed by Karl von Habsburg, distributed thousands of brochures inviting them to a picnic near the border at Sopron. It was the largest escape movement from East Germany since the Berlin Wall was built in 1961. After the picnic, which was based on an idea by Karl's father Otto von Habsburg to test the reaction of the USSR and Mikhail Gorbachev to an opening of the border, tens of thousands of media-informed East Germans set off for Hungary. The media reaction of Erich Honecker in the "Daily Mirror" of 19 August 1989 showed the public in East and West that there had been a loss of power by the Eastern European communist rulers in their own sphere of power, and that they were no longer the designers of what was happening: "Habsburg distributed leaflets far into Poland, on which the East German holidaymakers were invited to a picnic. When they came to the picnic, they were given gifts, food and Deutsche Mark, and then they were persuaded to come to the West." In particular, it was examined by Habsburg and the Hungarian Minister of State Imre Pozsgay, whether Moscow would give the Soviet troops stationed in Hungary the command to intervene. But, with the mass exodus at the Pan-European Picnic, the subsequent hesitant behavior of the Socialist Unity Party of East Germany and the nonintervention of the Soviet Union broke the dams. Thus, the bracket of the Eastern Bloc was broken. 

Tens of thousands of the media-informed East Germans now made their way to Hungary, which was no longer ready to keep its borders completely closed or to oblige its border troops to use force of arms. By the end of September 1989, more than 30,000 East Germans had escaped to the West before the GDR denied travel to Hungary, leaving Czechoslovakia as the only neighboring state to which East Germans could escape.

Even then, many people within and without Germany still believed that real reunification would never happen in the foreseeable future. The turning point in Germany, called "Die Wende", was marked by the "Peaceful Revolution" leading to the removal of the Berlin Wall, with East and West Germany subsequently entering into negotiations toward eliminating the division that had been imposed upon Germans more than four decades earlier.

Process of reunification

Cooperation 

On 28 November 1989—two weeks after the fall of the Berlin Wall—West German Chancellor Helmut Kohl announced a 10-point program calling for the two Germanies to expand their cooperation with a view toward eventual reunification.

Initially, no timetable was proposed. However, events rapidly came to a head in early 1990. First, in March, the Party of Democratic Socialism—the former Socialist Unity Party of Germany—was heavily defeated in East Germany's first free elections. A grand coalition was formed under Lothar de Maizière, leader of the East German wing of Kohl's Christian Democratic Union, on a platform of speedy reunification. Second, East Germany's economy and infrastructure underwent a swift and near-total collapse. Although East Germany was long reckoned as having the most robust economy in the Soviet bloc, the removal of Communist hegemony revealed the ramshackle foundations of that system. The East German mark had been almost worthless outside East Germany for some time before the events of 1989–1990, and the collapse of the East German economy further magnified the problem.

Economic merger 
Discussions immediately began on an emergency merger of the German economies. On 18 May 1990, the two German states signed a treaty agreeing on monetary, economic, and social union. This treaty is called  ("Treaty Establishing a Monetary, Economic and Social Union between the German Democratic Republic and the Federal Republic of Germany"); it came into force on 1 July 1990, with the West German Deutsche Mark replacing the East German mark as the official currency of East Germany. The Deutsche Mark had a very high reputation among the East Germans and was considered stable. While the GDR transferred its financial policy sovereignty to West Germany, the West started granting subsidies for the GDR budget and social security system. At the same time, many West German laws came into force in the GDR. This created a suitable framework for a political union by diminishing the huge gap between the two existing political, social, and economic systems.

German Reunification Treaty 

The Volkskammer, the Parliament of East Germany, passed a resolution on 23 August 1990 declaring the accession of the German Democratic Republic to the Federal Republic of Germany, and the extension of the field of application of the Federal Republic's Basic Law to the territory of East Germany as allowed by article 23 of the West German Basic Law, effective 3 October 1990. This Declaration of Accession was formally presented by the President of the Volkskammer, Sabine Bergmann-Pohl, to the President of the West German Bundestag, Rita Süssmuth, by means of a letter dated 25 August 1990. Thus, formally, the procedure of reunification by means of the accession of East Germany to West Germany, and of East Germany's acceptance of the Basic Law already in force in West Germany, was initiated as the unilateral, sovereign decision of East Germany, as allowed by the provisions of article 23 of the West German Basic Law as it then existed.

In the wake of that resolution of accession, the "German reunification treaty", commonly known in German as "" (Unification Treaty) or "" (Reunification Treaty), that had been negotiated between the two German states since 2 July 1990, was signed by representatives of the two governments on 31 August 1990. This Treaty, officially titled  (Treaty between the Federal Republic of Germany and the German Democratic Republic on the Establishment of German Unity), was approved by large majorities in the legislative chambers of both countries on 20 September 1990 (442–47 in the West German Bundestag and 299–80 in the East German Volkskammer). The Treaty passed the West German Bundesrat on the following day, 21 September 1990. The amendments to the Federal Republic's Basic Law that were foreseen in the Unification Treaty or necessary for its implementation were adopted by the Federal Statute of 23 September 1990, that enacted the incorporation of the Treaty as part of the Law of the Federal Republic of Germany. In the German Democratic Republic, the constitutional law giving effect to the Treaty was also published on 28 September 1990. With the adoption of the Treaty as part of its Constitution, East Germany legislated its own abolition as a State.

Under article 45 of the Treaty, it entered into force according to international law on 29 September 1990, upon the exchange of notices regarding the completion of the respective internal constitutional requirements for the adoption of the treaty in both East Germany and West Germany. With that last step, and in accordance with article 1 of the Treaty, and in conformity with East Germany's Declaration of Accession presented to the Federal Republic, Germany was officially reunited at 00:00 CEST on 3 October 1990. East Germany joined the Federal Republic as the five  (states) of Brandenburg, Mecklenburg-Western Pomerania, Saxony, Saxony-Anhalt, and Thuringia. These states were the five original states of East Germany but were abolished in 1952 in favor of a centralized system. As part of 18 May treaty, the five East German states were reconstituted on 23 August. At the same time, East and West Berlin united into one city, which became a city-state along the lines of the existing city-states of Bremen and Hamburg. Berlin was still formally under Allied occupation (that would only be terminated later, as a result of the provisions of the Two Plus Four Treaty), but the city's administrative merger and inclusion in the Federal Republic of Germany, effective on 3 October 1990, had been greenlit by the 4 Allies, and were formally approved in the final meeting of the Allied Control Council on 2 October 1990. In an emotional ceremony, at the stroke of midnight on 3 October 1990, the black-red-gold flag of West Germany—now the flag of a reunited Germany—was raised above the Brandenburg Gate, marking the moment of German reunification.

Constitutional merger

The process chosen was one of two options implemented in the West German constitution ( or Basic Law) of 1949 to facilitate eventual reunification. The Basic Law stated that it was only intended for temporary use until a permanent constitution could be adopted by the German people as a whole. Via that document's (then-existing) Article 23, any new prospective  could adhere to the Basic Law by a simple majority vote. The initial 11 joining states of 1949 constituted the Trizone. West Berlin had been proposed as the 12th state but was legally inhibited by Allied objections since Berlin as a whole was legally a quadripartite occupied area. Despite this, West Berlin's political affiliation was with West Germany, and, in many fields, it functioned de facto as if it were a component state of West Germany. On 1 January 1957, before the reunification, territory of Saarland under protectorate of France (1946-1956) unified with West Germany as West German state under the Article 23 procedure of West German basic law; the rejoining Germany of Saarland here was also called "Little reunification" although the Saar protectorate itself was only one disputed territory as it was never recognized but opposed by the Soviet Union one of the occupation powers in Germany i.e. an ACC's member.

The other option was Article 146, which provided a mechanism for a permanent constitution for a reunified Germany. This route would have entailed a formal union between two German states that then would have had to, among other things, create a new constitution for the newly established country. However, by the spring of 1990, it was apparent that drafting a new constitution would require protracted negotiations that would open up numerous issues in West Germany. Even without this to consider, by the start of 1990, East Germany was in a state of economic and political collapse. In contrast, reunification under Article 23 could be implemented in as little as six months.

Ultimately, when the treaty on monetary, economic, and social union was signed, it was decided to use the quicker process of Article 23. By this process, East Germany voted to dissolve itself and to join West Germany, and the area in which the Basic Law was in force simply extended to include them. Thus, while legally East Germany as a whole acceded to the Federal Republic, the constituent parts of East Germany entered into the Federal Republic as five new states, which held their first elections on 14 October 1990.

Nevertheless, although the Volkskammer's declaration of accession to the Federal Republic had initiated the process of reunification, the act of reunification itself (with its many specific terms, conditions, and qualifications, some of which required amendments to the Basic Law itself) was achieved constitutionally by the subsequent Unification Treaty of 31 August 1990; that is, through a binding agreement between the former GDR and the Federal Republic now recognizing each another as separate sovereign states in international law. This treaty was then voted into effect by both the Volkskammer and the Bundestag by the constitutionally required two-thirds majorities, effecting on the one hand, the extinction of the GDR, and on the other, the agreed amendments to the Basic Law of the Federal Republic. Hence, although the GDR declared its accession to the Federal Republic under Article 23 of the Basic Law, this did not imply its acceptance of the Basic Law as it then stood, but rather, of the Basic Law as subsequently amended in line with the Unification Treaty.

Legally, the reunification did not create a third state out of the two. Rather, West Germany effectively absorbed East Germany. Accordingly, on Unification Day, 3 October 1990, the German Democratic Republic ceased to exist, and five new federated states on its former territory joined the Federal Republic of Germany. East and West Berlin were reunited and joined the Federal Republic as a full-fledged federated city-state. Under this model, the Federal Republic of Germany, now enlarged to include the five states of the former GDR plus the reunified Berlin, continued legally to exist under the same legal personality that was founded in May 1949.

While the Basic Law was modified, rather than replaced by a constitution as such, it still permits the adoption of a formal constitution by the German people at some time in the future.

Unification of Berlin
In the context of urban planning, in addition to a wealth of new opportunity and the symbolism of two former independent states being rejoined, the reunification of Berlin presented numerous challenges. The city underwent massive redevelopment, involving the political, economic, and cultural environment of both East and West Berlin. However, the "scar" left by the Wall, which ran directly through the very heart of the city, had consequences for the urban environment that planning still needs to address.

The unification of Berlin presented legal, political, and technical challenges for the urban environment. The political division and physical separation of the city for more than 30 years saw the East and the West develop their own distinct urban forms, with many of these differences still visible to this day.

East and West Berlin were directed by two separate political and urban agendas. East Berlin developed a monocentric structure around government buildings and open spaces, while West Berlin was polycentric in nature, with central neighbourhoods that were higher-density but less residential. The two political systems allocated funds to postwar reconstruction differently, based on political priorities, and this had consequences for the reunification of the city. West Berlin had received considerably more financial assistance for reconstruction and refurbishment. There was considerable disparity in the general condition of many of the buildings: at the time of reunification, East Berlin still contained many leveled areas, which were previous sites of destroyed buildings from World War II, as well as damaged buildings that had not been repaired.

An immediate challenge facing the reunified city was the need for physical connectivity between the East and the West, specifically the organization of infrastructure. In the period following World War II, approximately half of the railway lines were removed in East Berlin. Urban rail required substantial work over more than a decade to fully reconnect the two halves of the city, and the tram network had been removed from the West, leaving it entirely in the East.

As urban planning in Germany is the responsibility of the city government, the integration of East and West Berlin was in part complicated by the fact that the existing planning frameworks became obsolete with the fall of the Wall. Prior to the reunification of the city, the Land Use Plan of 1988 and General Development Plan of 1980 defined the spatial planning criteria for West and East Berlin, respectively. These were replaced by the new, unified Land Use Plan in 1994. Termed "Critical Reconstruction", the new policy aimed to revive Berlin's prewar aesthetic; it was complemented by a strategic planning document for downtown Berlin, entitled "Inner City Planning Framework".

Following the dissolution of the GDR on 3 October 1990, all planning projects under the socialist regime were abandoned. Vacant lots, open areas, and empty fields in East Berlin were subject to redevelopment, in addition to space previously occupied by the Wall and associated buffer zone. Many of these sites were positioned in central, strategic locations of the reunified city.

Day of German Unity
To commemorate the day that marks the official unification of the former East and West Germany in 1990, 3 October has since then been the official German national holiday, the Day of German Unity. It replaced the previous national holiday held in West Germany on 17 June commemorating the East German uprising of 1953 and the national holiday on 7 October in the GDR, that commemorated the foundation of the East German state.

Domestic opposition 
Throughout the entire Cold War and up until 1990, reunification did not appear likely and the existence of two German countries was commonly regarded as an established, unalterable fact. Helmut Kohl briefly addressed this issue during the 1983 West German federal election, stating that despite his belief in German national unity, it would not mean a "return to the nation-state of earlier times". In the 1980s, opposition to a united German state was very common amongst left-wing and liberal parties of West Germany, especially the SPD and The Greens. The division of Germany was considered necessary to maintain peace in Europe, and an emergence of another German state was also seen as possibly dangerous to the West German democracy. A German publicist  wrote in 1981: "Considering the role Germany played in the origins of both World Wars, Europe cannot, and the Germans should not, want a new German Reich, a sovereign nation-state. That is the logic of history which is, as Bismarck noted, more exact than the Prussian government audit office." Opinion on reunification was not only highly partisan, but polarised along many social divides - Germans aged 35 or younger were opposed to unification, whereas older respondents were more supportive; likewise, low-income Germans tended to oppose reunification, whereas more affluent responders were likely to support it. Ultimately, a poll from July 1990 found that the main motivation for reunification was economic concern rather than nationalism.

Opinion polls from late 1980s showed that young East Germans and West Germans saw each other as foreign, and didn't regard themselves as a single nation. Heinrich August Winkler observes that "an evaluation of the corresponding data in the Deutschland Archiv in 1989 showed that the GDR was perceived by a large portion of the younger generation as a foreign nation with a different social order which was no longer a part of Germany". Winkler argues that the reunification was not a product of popular opinion, but rather "crisis management on the highest level". Support for unified Germany became low once the prospect it became a tangible reality in fall of 1989. A December 1989 poll by Der Spiegel indicated strong support for preserving East Germany as a separate state. However, SED members were overrepresented amongst the responders, constituting 13 % of the population, but 23 % of those polled. Reporting on a student protest in East Berlin on 4th of November, 1989,  noted that "virtually none of the demonstrators interviewed by Western reporters said they wanted unification with the Federal Republic". In West Germany, once it became clear that a course of quick unification was negotiated, the public responded with concern. In February 1990, two-thirds of West Germans considered the pace of unification as "too fast". West Germans were also hostile towards the newcomers from the East - according to a April 1990 poll, only 11 % of West Germans welcomed those emigrating from the GDR to West Germany.

Following the unification, the national divide persisted - a poll by the Allensbach Institute in April 1993 revealed that only 22 % of West Germans and 11 % of East Germans felt like one nation.  observed that "the sense of oneness felt by East Germans and West Germans in the euphoric period after the fall of the wall proved all too transitory", as the old divides persisted and the Germans not only still saw itself as two separate people, but also acted in their accordance with their separate, regional interests. This phemonenon became known as Mauer im Kopf ("wall in the head"), suggesting that the despite the Berlin Wall having fallen, a "psychological wall" still persists between eastern and western Germans. Augustine argues that despite the opposition to the political regime of East Germany, it still represented East Germans' history and identity. The unification caused backlash, and the Treuhandanstalt, an agency set up to carry out privatization, was blamed for creating mass uneployment and poverty in the East.

Social groups and figures
An influential part of the reunification opponents were the so-called Anti-Germans. Emerging from student Left, Anti-Germans were supportive of Israel and strongly opposed German nationalism, arguing that an emergence of a united German state would also result in a return of fascism. They found the social and political dynamics of 1980s and 1990s Germany as comparable to those of the 1930s, denouncing the emerging anti-Zionism, unification sentiments and reemergence of pan-nationalism and pan-germanism. Hermann L. Gremliza, who left the SPD in 1989 because of its support for German unification, was repulsed by the universal support for unification amongst most major parties, stating that it reminded him of "Social Democrats joining the National Socialists in singing the German national anthem in 1933, following Hitler's declaration of his foreign policy." The Anti-Germans' 1990 protests against German reunification had several thousands attentands.

According to Stephen Brockmann, German reunification was feared and opposed by ethnic minorities, particularly those of East Germany. He observes that "right-wing violence was on the rise throughout 1990 in the GDR, with frequent instances of beatings, rapes, and fights connected with xenophobia", which led to a police lockdown in Leipzig on the night of reunification. Tensions with Poland were high, and many internal ethnic minorities such as the Sorbs feared further displacement or assimilationist policies. While politicians called for acceptance of a new multiethnic society, many were unwilling to "give up its traditional racial definition of German nationality". Feminist groups also opposed the unification, as abortion laws were less restrictive in East Germany than in West Germany, and the progress that the GDR had made in regards to women welfare such as legal equality, child care and financial support were "all less impressive or non-existent in the West".

There was also a significant opposition to the unification amongst intellectual circles. Christa Wolf and Manfred Stolpe stressed the need to forge an East German identity, while "citizens' initiatives, church groups, and intellectuals of the first hour began issuing dire warnings about a possible Anschluss of the GDR by the Federal Republic". Many East Germans oppositionists and reformers advocated for a "third path" of an independent, democratic socialist East Germany. Stefan Heym argued that the preservation of the GDR was necessary to achieve the ideal of democratic socialism, urging East Germans to oppose "capitalist annexation" in favour of a democratic socialist society. Writers of both nations were concerned about the destruction of the East German or West Germany cultural identity respectively; in "Goodbye to the Literature of the Federal Republic," Frank Schirrmacher states that the literature of both states had been central to the consciousness and unique identity of both nations, with this newly developed culture being now endangered by looming reunification.

Günter Grass who went on to win Nobel Prize in Literature in 1999, also expressed his vehement opposition to the unification of Germany, citing his tragic memories of World War II as the reason. According to Grass, the emergence of National Socialism and the Holocaust has deprived Germany of its right to exist as a unified nation state, writing: "Historical responsibility dictates opposition to reunification, no matter how inevitable it may seem." He also claimed that "national victory threatens acultural defeat", as "blooming of German culture and philosophy is possible only at times of fruitful national disunity", citing Johann Wolfgang von Goethe's opposition to the German unification of 1870 as well. He also condemned the unification as philistinist and purely materialist, calling it "the monetary fetish, by now devoid of all joy." Heiner Müller supported Grass' criticism of the unification process, warning East Germans: "We will be a nation without dreams, we will lose our memories, our past, and therefore also our ability to hope."

Foreign support and opposition 

For decades, West Germany's allies stated their support for reunification. Israeli Prime Minister Yitzhak Shamir, who speculated that a country that "decided to kill millions of Jewish people" in the Holocaust "will try to do it again", was one of the few world leaders to publicly oppose it. As reunification became a realistic possibility, however, significant NATO and European opposition emerged in private.

A poll of four countries in January 1990 found that a majority of surveyed Americans and French supported reunification, while British and Poles were more divided: 69 percent of Poles and 50 percent of French and British stated that they worried about a reunified Germany becoming "the dominant power in Europe". Those surveyed stated several concerns, including Germany again attempting to expand its territory, a revival of Nazism, and the German economy becoming too powerful. While British, French, and Americans favored Germany remaining a member of NATO, a majority of Poles supported neutrality for the reunified state.

The key ally was the United States. Although some top American officials opposed quick unification, Secretary of State James A. Baker and President George H. W. Bush provided strong and decisive support to Kohl's proposals.

United Kingdom and France
Margaret Thatcher was one of the most vehement opponents of German reunification. Before the fall of the Berlin Wall, British Prime Minister Margaret Thatcher told Soviet General Secretary Mikhail Gorbachev that neither the United Kingdom nor, according to her, Western Europe, wanted the reunification of Germany. Thatcher also clarified she wanted the Soviet leader to do what he could to stop it, telling Gorbachev "We do not want a united Germany". Although she welcomed East German democracy, Thatcher worried that a rapid reunification might weaken Gorbachev and favored Soviet troops staying in East Germany as long as possible to act as a counterweight to a united Germany.

Thatcher, who carried in her handbag a map of Germany's 1937 borders to show others the "German problem", feared that its "national character", size, and central location in Europe would cause the country to be a "destabilizing rather than a stabilizing force in Europe". In December 1989, she warned fellow European Community leaders at a Council summit in Strasbourg that Kohl attended, "We defeated the Germans twice! And now they're back!". Although Thatcher had stated her support for German self-determination in 1985, she now argued that Germany's allies only supported reunification because they did not believe it would ever happen. Thatcher favored a transition period of five years for reunification, during which the two Germanies would remain separate states. Although she gradually softened her opposition, as late as March 1990, Thatcher summoned historians and diplomats to a seminar at Chequers to ask "How dangerous are the Germans?", and the French ambassador in London reported that Thatcher told him, "France and Great Britain should pull together today in the face of the German threat."

The pace of events surprised the French, whose Foreign Ministry had concluded in October 1989 that reunification "does not appear realistic at this moment". A representative of French President François Mitterrand reportedly told an aide to Gorbachev, "France by no means wants German reunification, although it realises that in the end, it is inevitable." At the Strasbourg summit, Mitterrand and Thatcher discussed the fluidity of Germany's historical borders. On 20 January 1990, Mitterrand told Thatcher that a unified Germany could "make more ground than even Adolf had". He predicted that "bad" Germans would reemerge, who might seek to regain former German territory lost after World War II and would likely dominate Hungary, Poland, and Czechoslovakia, leaving "only Romania and Bulgaria for the rest of us". The two leaders saw no way to prevent reunification, however, as "None of us was going to declare war on Germany". Mitterrand recognized before Thatcher that reunification was inevitable and adjusted his views accordingly; unlike her, he was hopeful that participation in a single currency and other European institutions could control a united Germany. Mitterrand still wanted Thatcher to publicly oppose unification, however, to obtain more concessions from Germany.

Rest of Europe

Ireland's Taoiseach, Charles Haughey, supported German reunification and he took advantage of Ireland's presidency of the European Economic Community to call for an extraordinary European summit in Dublin in April 1990 to calm the fears held of fellow members of the EEC. Haughey saw similarities between Ireland and Germany, and said "I have expressed a personal view that coming as we do from a country which is also divided many of us would have sympathy with any wish of the people of the two German States for unification". Der Spiegel later described other European leaders' opinion of reunification at the time as "icy". Italy's Giulio Andreotti warned against a revival of "pan-Germanism" and the Netherlands's Ruud Lubbers questioned the German right to self-determination. They shared Britain's and France's concerns over a return to German militarism and the economic power of a reunified country. The consensus opinion was that reunification, if it must occur, should not occur until at least 1995 and preferably much later.

Final settlement 
The victors of World War II—France, the Soviet Union, the United Kingdom, and the United States, comprising the Four-Power Authorities—retained authority over Berlin, such as control over air travel and its political status. From the onset, the Soviet Union sought to use reunification as a way to push Germany out of NATO into neutrality, removing nuclear weapons from its territory. However, West Germany misinterpreted a 21 November 1989 diplomatic message on the topic to mean that the Soviet leadership already anticipated reunification only two weeks after the Wall's collapse. This belief, and the worry that his rival Genscher might act first, encouraged Kohl on 28 November to announce a detailed "Ten Point Program for Overcoming the Division of Germany and Europe". While his speech was very popular within West Germany, it caused concern among other European governments, with whom he had not discussed the plan.

The Americans did not share the Europeans' and Soviets' historical fears over German expansionism; Condoleezza Rice later recalled,

The United States wished to ensure, however, that Germany would stay within NATO. In December 1989, the administration of President George H. W. Bush made a united Germany's continued NATO membership a requirement for supporting reunification. Kohl agreed, although less than 20 percent of West Germans supported remaining within NATO. Kohl also wished to avoid a neutral Germany, as he believed that would destroy NATO, cause the United States and Canada to leave Europe, and cause Britain and France to form an anti-German alliance. The United States increased its support of Kohl's policies, as it feared that otherwise Oskar Lafontaine, a critic of NATO, might become Chancellor.

Horst Teltschik, Kohl's foreign policy advisor, later recalled that Germany would have paid "100 billion deutschmarks" if the Soviets demanded it. The USSR did not make such great demands, however, with Gorbachev stating in February 1990 that "[t]he Germans must decide for themselves what path they choose to follow". In May 1990, he repeated his remark in the context of NATO membership while meeting Bush, amazing both the Americans and Germans. This removed the last significant roadblock to Germany being free to choose its international alignments, though Kohl made no secret that he intended for the reunified Germany to inherit West Germany's seats in NATO and the EC.

During a NATO–Warsaw Pact conference in Ottawa, Canada; Genscher persuaded the four powers to treat the two Germanies as equals instead of defeated junior partners and for the six nations to negotiate alone. Although the Dutch, Italians, Spanish, and other NATO powers opposed such a structure, which meant that the alliance's boundaries would change without their participation, the six nations began negotiations in March 1990. After Gorbachev's May agreement on German NATO membership, the Soviets further agreed that Germany would be treated as an ordinary NATO country, with the exception that former East German territory would not have foreign NATO troops or nuclear weapons. In exchange, Kohl agreed to reduce the sizes of the militaries of both West and East Germany, renounce weapons of mass destruction, and accept the postwar Oder–Neisse line as Germany's eastern border. In addition, Germany agreed to pay about 55 billion deutschmarks to the Soviet Union in gifts and loans, the equivalent of eight days of the West German GDP. To oppose German reunification, the British insisted to the end, against Soviet opposition, that NATO be allowed to hold maneuvers in the former East Germany. Thatcher later wrote that her opposition to reunification had been an "unambiguous failure".

German sovereignty and withdrawal of the Allied Forces

On 15 March 1991, the Treaty on the Final Settlement with Respect to Germany—that had been signed in Moscow back on 12 September 1990 by the two German states that then existed (East and West Germany) on one side and by the four principal Allied powers (the United Kingdom, France, the Soviet Union, and the United States) on the other—entered into force, having been ratified by the Federal Republic of Germany (after the unification, as the united Germany) and by the four Allied states. The entry into force of that treaty (also known as the "Two Plus Four Treaty", in reference to the two German states and four Allied governments that signed it) put an end to the then-remaining limitations on German sovereignty and the ACC that resulted from the post-World War II arrangements. After the Americans intervened, both the United Kingdom and France ratified the Treaty on the Final Settlement with Respect to Germany in September 1990. The Treaty entered into force on 15 March 1991,  In accordance with Article 9 of the Two Plus Four Treaty, it entered into force as soon as all ratifications were deposited with the Government of Germany. thus finalizing the reunification for purposes of international law. The last party to ratify the treaty was the Soviet Union, that deposited its instrument of ratification on 15 March 1991. The Supreme Soviet of the USSR only gave its approval to the ratification of the treaty on 4 March 1991, after a hefty debate. Even prior to the ratification of the Treaty, the operation of all quadripartite Allied institutions in Germany was suspended, with effect from the reunification of Germany on 3 October 1990 and pending the final ratification of the Two Plus Four Treaty, pursuant to a declaration signed in New York on 1 October 1990 by the foreign ministers of the four Allied Powers, that was witnessed by ministers of the two German states then in existence, and that was appended text of the Two Plus Four Treaty. However, the Soviets cited their occupation rights for the last time as late as on 13 March 1991, just two days before the Treaty became effective, when the Honeckers were enabled by Soviet hardliners to flee Germany on a military jet to Moscow from the Soviet-controlled Sperenberg Airfield, with the German Federal Government being notified of this in advance of just one hour.

Under the treaty on final settlement (which should not be confused with the Unification Treaty that was signed only between the two German states), the last Allied forces still present in Germany left in 1994, in accordance with article 4 of the treaty, that set 31 December 1994 as the deadline for the withdrawal of the remaining Allied forces. The bulk of Russian ground forces left Germany on 25 June 1994 with a military parade of the 6th Guards Motor Rifle Brigade in Berlin. This was followed by the closure of the  United States Army Berlin command on 12 July 1994, an event that was marked by a casing of the colors ceremony witnessed by President Bill Clinton. The withdrawal of the last Russian troops (the Russian Army's Western Group of Forces) was completed on 31 August 1994, and the event was marked by a military ceremony in the Treptow Park in Berlin, with the presence of Russian President Yeltsin and German Chancellor Kohl. Although the bulk of the British, American, and French Forces had left Germany even before the departure of the Russians, the Western Allies kept a presence in Berlin until the completion of the Russian withdrawal, and the ceremony marking the departure of the remaining Forces of the Western Allies was the last to take place: on 8 September 1994, a Farewell Ceremony in the courtyard of the Charlottenburg Palace, with the presence of British Prime Minister John Major, American Secretary of State Warren Christopher, French President François Mitterrand, and German Chancellor Helmut Kohl, marked the withdrawal of the British, American and French Occupation Forces from Berlin, and the termination of the Allied occupation in Germany. Thus, the removal of the Allied presence took place a few months before the final deadline.

Article 5 banned the deployment of nuclear weapons in the territory previously controlled by the DDR and well as a ban on stationing non-German military personnel.

Polish border
On 14 November 1990, Germany and Poland signed the German–Polish Border Treaty, finalizing Germany's boundaries as permanent along the Oder–Neisse line, and thus, renouncing any claims to Silesia, East Brandenburg, Farther Pomerania, and the southern area of the former province of East Prussia. The subsequent German–Polish Treaty of Good Neighbourship that supplemented the Border Treaty also granted certain rights for political minorities on either side of the border. The following month, the first all-German free elections since 1932 were held, resulting in an increased majority for the coalition government of Chancellor Helmut Kohl.

As for the German–Polish Border Treaty, it was approved by the Polish Sejm on 26 November 1991 and the German Bundestag on 16 December 1991, and entered into force with the exchange of the instruments of ratification on 16 January 1992. The confirmation of the border between Germany and Poland was required of Germany by the four Allied countries in the Two Plus Four Treaty.

Effects

International effects
The reunification made Germany become a great power in the world again. The practical result of the chosen legal model of the unification (the incorporation of the territory of German Democratic Republic by the Federal Republic of Germany, and the continuation of the legal personality of the now enlarged Federal Republic) is that the expanded Federal Republic of Germany inherited the old West Germany's seats at the UN, NATO, the European Communities, and other international organizations. It also continued to be a party to all the treaties the old West Germany signed prior to the moment of reunification. The Basic Law and statutory laws that were in force in the Federal Republic, as amended in accordance with the Unification Treaty, continued automatically in force but now applied to the expanded territory. Also, the same President, Chancellor (Prime Minister), and Government of the Federal Republic remained in office, but their jurisdiction now included the newly acquired territory of the former East Germany.

To facilitate this process and to reassure other countries, fundamental changes were made to the German constitution. The Preamble and Article 146 were amended, and Article 23 was replaced, but the deleted former Article 23 was applied as the constitutional model to be used for the 1990 reunification. Hence, prior to the five "New Länder" of East Germany joining, the Basic Law was amended to indicate that all parts of Germany would then be unified such that Germany could now no longer consider itself constitutionally open to further extension to include the former eastern territories of Germany, that were now Polish, Russian, or Lithuanian. The changes effectively formalized the Oder–Neisse line as Germany's permanent eastern border. These amendments to the Basic Law were mandated by Article I, section 4 of the Two Plus Four Treaty.

Domestic effects

Vast differences between former East Germany and West Germany in lifestyle, wealth, political beliefs, and other matters remain, and it is therefore still common to speak of eastern and western Germany distinctly. It is often referred to as the "wall in the head".  (Easterners) are stereotyped as racist, poor, and largely influenced by Russian culture, while  (Westerners) are usually considered snobbish, dishonest, wealthy, and selfish. East Germans indicate a dissatisfaction with the status quo and cultural alienation from the rest of Germany, and a sense that their cultural heritage is not acknowledged enough in the now unified Germany. The West, on the other hand, has become uninterested in what the East has to say, and this has led to more resentment toward the East, exacerbating the divide. Both the West and the East have failed to sustain an openminded dialogue, and the failure to grasp the effects of the institutional path dependency has increased the frustration each side feels.

The economy of eastern Germany has struggled since unification, and large subsidies are still transferred from west to east. Economically, eastern Germany has had a sharp rise of 10 percent to West Germany’s 5 percent. Western Germany also still holds 56 percent of the GDP. Part of this disparity between the East and the West lies in the Western labor Unions' demand for high-wage pacts in an attempt to prevent "low-wage zones".  This caused many Germans from the East to be outpriced in the market, adding to the slump in businesses in eastern Germany as well as the rising unemployment. The former East German area has often been compared to the underdeveloped Southern Italy and the Southern United States during Reconstruction after the American Civil War. While the economy of eastern Germany has recovered recently, the differences between East and West remain present.

Politicians and scholars have frequently called for a process of "inner reunification" of the two countries and asked whether there is "inner unification or continued separation". "The process of German unity has not ended yet", proclaimed Chancellor Angela Merkel, who grew up in East Germany, in 2009. Nevertheless, the question of this "inner reunification" has been widely discussed in the German public, politically, economically, culturally, and also constitutionally since 1989.

Politically, since the fall of the Berlin Wall, the successor party of the former East German socialist state party has become a major force in German politics. It was renamed PDS, and, later, merged with the Western leftist party WASG to form the party The Left.

Constitutionally, the Basic Law of West Germany provided two pathways for unification. The first was the implementation of a new all-German constitution, safeguarded by a popular referendum. The second way was more technical: the implementation of the constitution in the East, using a paragraph originally designed for the West German states in case of internal reorganization like the merger of two states. While this latter option was chosen as the most feasible one, the first option was partly regarded as a means to foster the "inner reunification".

A public manifestation of coming to terms with the past is the existence of the so-called Birthler-Behörde, the Federal Commissioner for the Stasi Records, which collects and maintains the files of the East German security apparatus.

The economic reconstruction of former East Germany following the reunification required large amounts of public funding which turned some areas into boom regions, although overall unemployment remains higher than in the former West. Unemployment was part of a process of deindustrialization starting rapidly after 1990. Causes for this process are disputed in political conflicts up to the present day. But many critics from East Germany point out that it was the shock-therapy style of privatization that did not leave room for East German enterprises to adapt, and that alternatives like a slow transition had been possible.

Reunification did, however, lead to a large rise in the average standard of living in former East Germany, and a stagnation in the West as $2 trillion in public spending was transferred East. Between 1990 and 1995, gross wages in the east rose from 35 percent to 74 percent of western levels, while pensions rose from 40 percent to 79 percent. Unemployment reached double the western level as well. West German cities close to the former border of East and West Germany experienced a disproportionate loss of market access relative to other West German cities which were not as greatly affected by the reunification of Germany.

In terms of media usage and reception, the country remains partially divided especially among the older generations. Mentality gaps between East and West persist, but so does sympathy. Additionally, the integration between Easterners and Westerners is not happening on as large a scale as was expected. Young people have on average very little knowledge of former East Germany.

Today, there are several prominent people of East German origin, including Michael Ballack, Katarina Witt, Till Lindemann and Paul van Dyk.

Unified Berlin 

While the fall of the Berlin Wall had broad economic, political, and social impacts globally, it also had significant consequence for the local urban environment. In fact, the events of 9 November 1989 saw East Berlin and West Berlin, two halves of a single city that had ignored one another for the better part of 40 years, finally "in confrontation with one another". There was a belief in the city that, after 40 years of division, the unified city would be well placed to become a major metropolis.

Berlin's urban organization experienced significant upheaval following the physical and metaphorical collapse of the Wall, as the city sought to "re-invent itself as a 'Western' metropolis".

Redevelopment of vacant lots, open areas, and empty fields, as well as space previously occupied by the Wall and associated buffer zone, were based on land use priorities as reflected in "Critical Reconstruction" policies. Green space and recreational areas were allocated 38 percent of freed land; six percent of freed land was dedicated to mass-transit systems to address transport inadequacies.

Unification of the city initiatives also included the construction of major office and commercial projects, as well as the renovation of housing estates in East Berlin.

Another key priority was reestablishing Berlin as the seat of government of Germany, and this required buildings to serve government needs, including the "redevelopment of sites for scores of foreign embassies".

With respect to redefining the city's identity, emphasis was placed on restoring Berlin's traditional landscape. "Critical Reconstruction" policies sought to disassociate the city's identity from its Nazi and socialist legacy, though some remnants were preserved, with walkways and bicycle paths established along the border strip to preserve the memory of the Wall. In the center of East Berlin, much of the modernist heritage of the East German state was gradually removed. Unification of Berlin saw the removal of politically motivated street names and monuments in the East in an attempt to reduce the socialist legacy from the face of East Berlin.

Immediately following the fall of the Wall, Berlin experienced a boom in the construction industry. Redevelopment initiatives saw Berlin turn into one of the largest construction sites in the world through the 1990s and early 2000s.

The fall of the Wall also had economic consequences. Two German systems covering distinctly divergent degrees of economic opportunity suddenly came into intimate contact. Despite development of sites for commercial purposes, Berlin struggled to compete in economic terms with Frankfurt which remained the financial capital of the country, as well as with other key West German centers such as Munich, Hamburg, Stuttgart and Düsseldorf. The intensive building activity directed by planning policy resulted in the over-expansion of office space, "with a high level of vacancies in spite of the move of most administrations and government agencies from Bonn".

Berlin was marred by disjointed economic restructuring, associated with massive deindustrialisation. Economist Hartwich asserts that, while the East undoubtedly improved economically, it was "at a much slower pace than [then Chancellor Helmut] Kohl had predicted". Wealth and income inequality between former East and West Germany continued for decades after reunification. On average, adults in the former West Germany had assets worth 94,000 euros in 2014 as compared to the adults in the former communist East Germany which had just over 40,000 euros in assets.

Facilitation of economic development through planning measures failed to close the disparity between East and West, not only in terms of the economic opportunity, but also housing conditions and transport options. Tölle states that "the initial euphoria about having become one unified people again was increasingly replaced by a growing sense of difference between Easterners ("Ossis") and Westerners ("Wessis")". The fall of the Wall also instigated immediate cultural change. The first consequence was the closure in East Berlin of politically oriented cultural institutions.

The fall of the Berlin Wall and the factors described above led to mass migration from East Berlin and East Germany, producing a large labor supply shock in the West. Emigration from the East, totaling 870,000 people between 1989 and 1992 alone, led to worse employment outcomes for the least-educated workers, for blue-collar workers, for men, and for foreign nationals.

At the close of the century, it became evident that despite significant investment and planning, Berlin was unlikely to retake "its seat between the European Global Cities of London and Paris", primarily due to the fact that Germany's financial and commercial capital is located elsewhere (Frankfurt) than the administrative one (Berlin), in resemblance of Italy (Milan vs Rome), Switzerland (Zürich vs Bern), Canada (Toronto vs Ottawa), Australia (Sydney vs Canberra), the USA (New York City vs Washington, DC) or the Netherlands (Amsterdam vs The Hague), as opposed to London, Paris, Madrid, Vienna, Warsaw or Moscow which combine both roles.

Yet, ultimately, the disparity between East and West portions of Berlin has led to the city achieving a new urban identity. A number of locales of East Berlin, characterized by dwellings of in-between use of abandoned space for little to no rent, have become the focal point and foundation of Berlin's burgeoning creative activities. According to Berlin Mayor Klaus Wowereit, "the best that Berlin has to offer, its unique creativity. Creativity is Berlin's future." Overall, the Berlin government's engagement in creativity is strongly centered on marketing and promotional initiatives instead of creative production.

Creativity has been the catalyst for the city's "thriving music scene, active nightlife, and bustling street scene", all of which have become important attractions for the German capital. The industry is a key component of the city's economic makeup with more than 10 percent of all Berlin residents employed in cultural sectors.

Assessment

Cost of reunification
In addition, the immensely advantageous exchange rate of 1:1 between the West German Deutschmark to the East German mark meant that East Germans could trade in their almost worthless marks for and receive wages in West German currency. This dealt a major blow to the West German budget in the coming few years. Peer Steinbrück is quoted as saying in a 2011 interview, "Over a period of 20 years, German reunification has cost 2 trillion euros, or an average of 100 billion euros a year. So, we have to ask ourselves 'Aren't we willing to pay a tenth of that over several years for Europe's unity?

Views and life satisfaction

According to a 2019 survey conducted by Pew Research Center, approximately 90 percent of Germans living in both the West and East believe that reunification was good for Germany, with slightly more in East than West Germany supporting it. Around 83 percent of East Germans approve of and 13 percent disapprove of eastern Germany's transition to a market economy, with the rest saying they weren't sure. Life satisfaction in both the East and West has substantially increased since 1991, with 15 percent of East Germans placing their life satisfaction somewhere between 7 to 10 on a 0 to 10 scale in 1991, changing to 59 percent in 2019. For West Germans, this change over the same time period was from 52 to 64 percent.

Additionally, the fall of the Berlin Wall was useful in generating wealth at the household level in both the East and the West. Those who lived in West Germany and had social ties to the East experienced a six percent average increase in their wealth in the six years following the fall of the Wall, which more than doubled that of households who didn't possess the same connections. Entrepreneurs who worked in areas with strong social ties to the East saw their incomes increase at an even more rapid rate. Incomes for this group increased at an average rate of 8.8 percent over the same six year period following reunification. Similarly, those in the East who possessed connections to the West saw their household income increase at a positive rate in each of the six years following reunification. Those in their regions who lacked the same ties did not see the same benefit. More broadly, commercial firms, in the same way as households and individuals, also saw profits increase in the years following reunification. Specifically, gains in the form of increased profits were the greatest for firms in the service sector who invested in the East relative to those which did not. The reunification served to increase economic growth in the region through rising household income and commercial profit due to the ability to utilize social connections that were previously restricted by the border.

Comparison

Germany was not the only country that had been separated through the aftermath of World War II which led to the Cold War. For example, Korea (1945–present), China (1949–present), Yemen (1967-1990), and Vietnam (1954–1976) have been separated through the occupation of "Western-Capitalistic" and "Eastern-Communistic" forces, after the defeat of Japan. Both countries suffered severely from this separation in the Chinese Civil War (1927–1949), Korean War (1950–1953), the Vietnam War (1955–1975), respectively, which caused heavy economic and civilian damage. However, German separation did not result in another war. Moreover, Germany is the only one of these countries that has managed to achieve a peaceful reunification without subsequent violent conflict. For instance, Vietnam achieved reunification after Vietnam War but under communist regime in 1976, Yemen achieved peaceful reunification under capitalist regime in 1990 but then suffered a civil war due to the internal conflict, while North and South Korea as well as Mainland China and Taiwan still struggle with high political tensions and huge economic and social disparities, making a possible reunification an enormous challenge. With China, the Taiwan independence movement makes Chinese unification more difficult. East and West Germany today also still have differences in economy and social ideology like North and South Vietnam due to separation from 1945 to 1990.

See also 

 Inner German relations
 Albanian unification
 Chinese unification
 Cypriot reunification
 Good Bye, Lenin!
 Irish reunification
 Korean reunification
 Transitology
 Unification of Romania and Moldova
 Vietnamese reunification
 Yemeni unification

Notes

References

Further reading 
 Blumenau, Bernhard, 'German Foreign Policy and the ‘German Problem’ During and After the Cold War: Changes and Continuities'. in: B Blumenau, J Hanhimäki & B Zanchetta (eds), New Perspectives on the End of the Cold War: Unexpected Transformations? Ch. 5. London: Routledge, 2018. .
 Engel, Jeffrey A. When the World Seemed New: George H. W. Bush and the End of the Cold War (2018) pp. 273–291.
Maier, Charles S., Dissolution: The Crisis of Communism and the End of East Germany (Princeton UP, 1997).
 Meacham, Jon. Destiny and Power: The American Odyssey of George Herbert Walker Bush (2015), pp. 397–408.
 Schemper, Lukas. "Diasporas and American debates on German unification." Journal of Transatlantic Studies 15.1 (2017): 41–60  online.
 Spohr, Kristina. "German Unification: Between Official History, Academic Scholarship, and Political Memoirs" Historical Journal 43#3 (2000), pp. 869–888, at p. 876. online.
 Zelikow, Philip and Condoleezza Rice, Germany Unified and Europe Transformed: A Study in Statecraft (Harvard University Press, 1997) excerpt.

Primary sources
 Jarausch, Konrad H., and Volker Gransow, eds. Uniting Germany: Documents and Debates, 1944–1993 (1994), primary sources in English translation

External links

 The Unification Treaty (Berlin, 31 August 1990) website of CVCE (Centre of European Studies)
 Hessler, Uwe, "The End of East Germany", dw-world.de, 23 August 2005.
 Berg, Stefan, Steffen Winter and Andreas Wassermann, "Germany's Eastern Burden: The Price of a Failed Reunification", Der Spiegel, 5 September 2005.
 Wiegrefe, Klaus, "An Inside Look at the Reunification Negotiations"Der Spiegel, 29 September 2010.
 "Unfriendly, even dangerous"? Margaret Thatcher and German Unification, Academia.edu, 2016.
Problems with Reunification from the Dean Peter Krogh Foreign Affairs Digital Archives

 
Contemporary German history
Reunification
1990 in East Germany
1990 in West Germany
1990 in international relations
National unifications
Germany–Soviet Union relations
Peaceful Revolution
Ostalgie